William Winter Stuckey (27 July 1873 – 21 September 1928) was an Australian rules footballer in the Victorian Football League (VFL).

Stuckey made his debut for the Carlton Football Club in round 1 of the 1899 season. He left the Blues at the end of the 1901 season. He was the brother of Essendon player George Stuckey.

References

External links

Will Stuckey at Blueseum

Carlton Football Club players
West Melbourne Football Club players
Australian rules footballers from Victoria (Australia)
1873 births
1928 deaths
Essendon Football Club (VFA) players